Miss Bénin (formerly known as Miss Dahomey) is the national beauty pageant in Benin. The pageant winner aims to be a cultural ambassador of Benin. Before that Miss Benin experienced at Miss Universe 1962 once.

History
Debuted in 1962 as Miss Dahomey pageant, Benin competed internationally at Miss Universe 1962 in Miami, Florida. Benin existed once as Dahomey on international pageant and became an African kingdom which lasted from 1600 until 1900.

Titleholders

Past titleholders under Miss Bénin org.

Miss Universe Bénin

References

External links
missbenin.net

 
Benin
Recurring events established in 1962
Beninese awards
1962 establishments in Africa